Scuola di ladri - Parte seconda is a 1987 Italian comedy film directed by Neri Parenti starring Enrico Maria Salerno, who reprised his role of thief Aliprando, with Paolo Villaggio and Massimo Boldi. It is the sequel to the 1986 film Scuola di ladri.

Plot summary 
Milan, Italy mid-1980s. In this second episode Dalmazio and Egisto come, respectively, from the prison and the insane asylum. They risk a second arrest for their awkwardness so they return from their "uncle" who is willing to help them.

Cast 
 Enrico Maria Salerno as Aliprando Siraghi
 Paolo Villaggio as Dalmazio Siraghi
 Massimo Boldi as Egisto Siraghi
 Florence Guérin as Susanna Volpi
 John Richardson as the ship's captain
 Daniel Lambert as the rich jeweler
 Romano Puppo as boatswain
 Stefano Antonucci as a traveler by train
 Claudio Boldi as an armored

Release
The film was released in Italy on September 22, 1987

References

External links

1987 films
1987 comedy films
1980s Italian-language films
Italian comedy films
Films directed by Neri Parenti
Films scored by Bruno Zambrini
1980s Italian films